Eric John Blake (born 30 August 1946) is a former British boxer. He competed in the men's light middleweight event at the 1968 Summer Olympics.

Blake won the 1968 Amateur Boxing Association British light-middleweight title, when boxing out of the Battersea ABC.

References

External links
 

1946 births
Living people
British male boxers
Olympic boxers of Great Britain
Boxers at the 1968 Summer Olympics
Sportspeople from Epsom
Light-middleweight boxers